Three sportsmen from Austria competed at the 1896 Summer Olympics.  Though Austria was then a part of Austria-Hungary, most sources separate Austrian competitors from the Hungarians at the 1896 Games.

Medalists

Multiple medalists
The following competitors won multiple medals at the 1896 Olympic Games.

Competitors
The following is the list of number of competitors in the Games.

Cycling

All three of Schmal's medals were won in the cycling competitions, even though he competed in two different sports.  He competed in four events, earning a top three finish in three of them. In the time trial event, Schmal tied for second place Stamatios Nikolopoulos. A race-off between the two broke the tie in favor of the Greek athlete.

Track

Fencing

Schmal also competed in the sabre fencing tournament, placing fourth in the five-man round robin.

Swimming

Two Austrian swimmers competed in 1896.  One of the two competed in each of the three open events, and each swimmer won one medal.

References

  (Digitally available at )
  (Excerpt available at )
 

Nations at the 1896 Summer Olympics
1896
Olympics